Francisco Figueiredo (born October 23, 1989) is a Brazilian mixed martial artist who competed in the Flyweight division of the Ultimate Fighting Championship. He is the younger brother of the two-time and former UFC Flyweight Champion Deiveson Figueiredo.

Background
Figueiredo was born in Soure, Pará, Brazil, a small city on the isle of Marajó where buffaloes roam freely. His father was a buffalo herder who practiced luta marajoara, a local folk wrestling style. Francisco has a younger sister and a brother – Deiveson – who also is a professional mixed martial artist signed with the UFC. He was the first brother to move to Belém to attend high school and started training in capoeira at the age of 13. He worked as a bartender and assistant in a sushi kitchen before concentrating full time on his fight career.

Mixed martial arts career

Early career
Starting his professional career in 2009, he compiled up a professional MMA record of 11-3-1 (1), over a decade on the Brazilian regional scene, most notably making a name fighting for Jungle Fight promotion. After winning the Jungle Fight Interim Bantamweight Championship at Jungle Fight 93 against Manoel dos Santos, at Jungle Fight 95 he fought to a draw in a title unification bout with Eduardo Souza at Jungle Fight 95. Figueiredo was scheduled to appear at Jungle Fight 103 against Klinger Pinheiro, the reigning bantamweight champion, but the event was canceled because of the coronavirus pandemic.

Ultimate Fighting Championship
Figueiredo made his UFC debut against Jerome Rivera at UFC on ESPN: Chiesa vs. Magny on January 20, 2021. He won the bout via unanimous decision.

In his sophomore performance, Figueiredo faced Malcolm Gordon on July 17, 2021 at UFC on ESPN 26. He lost the fight via unanimous decision.

Figueiredo was scheduled to face Jake Hadley on March 19, 2022 at UFC Fight Night: Volkov vs. Aspinall. However, Figueiredo withdrew from the event due to undisclosed reasons and was replaced by Allan Nascimento.

Figueiredo faced Daniel Lacerda on April 30, 2022 at UFC on ESPN: Font vs. Vera. He won the fight via kneebar submission in the first round. This win earned him his first Performance of the Night bonus award.

Figueiredo faced Amir Albazi on August 20, 2022 at UFC 278. He lost the bout via rear-naked choke at the end of first round.

On August, it was announced that Figueiredo was not longer in the UFC roster.

Championships and accomplishments
Jungle Fight Championship
Jungle Fight Interim Bantamweight Championship (One time)
 Ultimate Fighting Championship
 Performance of the Night (One time) (vs. Daniel Lacerda)

Mixed martial arts record

|-
|Loss
|align=center|13–5–1 (1)
|Amir Albazi
|Submission (rear-naked choke)
|UFC 278
|
|align=center|1
|align=center|4:34
|Salt Lake City, Utah, United States
|
|-
|Win
|align=center|13–4–1 (1)
|Daniel Lacerda
|Submission (kneebar)
|UFC on ESPN: Font vs. Vera
|
|align=center|1
|align=center|1:18
|Las Vegas, Nevada, United States
|
|-
|Loss
|align=center|12–4–1 (1)
|Malcolm Gordon
|Decision (unanimous)
|UFC on ESPN: Makhachev vs. Moisés
|
|align=center|3
|align=center|5:00
|Las Vegas, Nevada, United States
|
|-
|Win
|align=center|12–3–1 (1)
|Jerome Rivera
|Decision (unanimous)
|UFC on ESPN: Chiesa vs. Magny
|
|align=center|3
|align=center|5:00
|Abu Dhabi, United Arab Emirates
|
|-
|Draw
|align=center|11–3–1 (1)
|Eduardo Souza
|Draw (unanimous)
|Jungle Fight 95
|
|align=center|3
|align=center|5:00
|Rio de Janeiro, Brazil
|
|-
|Win
|align=center|11–3 (1)
|Manoel dos Santos
|TKO (punches)
|Jungle Fight 93
|
|align=center|2
|align=center|N/A
|Belém, Brazil
|
|-
|Win
|align=center|10–3 (1)
|Vitor Leandro
|TKO (punches)
|Salvaterra Marajó Fight 7
|
|align=center|1
|align=center|N/A
|Salvaterra, Brazil
|
|-
|Loss
|align=center|9–3 (1)
|Eduardo Souza
|Decision (split)
|Jungle Fight 91
|
|align=center|3
|align=center|5:00
|Contagem, Brazil
|
|-
|Win
|align=center|9–2 (1)
|Cris Willian
|Submission (arm-triangle choke)
|Marajó Open Fight 2
|
|align=center| 2
|align=center| 2:54
|Soure, Brazil
|
|-
|NC
|align=center|8–2 (1)
|Jose Silva
|No Contest
|Super Bad Boy's Fight 3
|
|align=center|N/A
|align=center|N/A
|Belém, Brazil
|  
|-
|Win
|align=center|8–2
|Josue Junior Souza
|Submission (armbar)
|Boxe Thai Belem: Super Fight
|
|align=center|1
|align=center|2:48
|Belém, Brazil
|
|-
|Win
|align=center|7–2
|Fabricio Sarraff
|Decision (unanimous)
|Jungle Fight 52
|
|align=center|3
|align=center|5:00
|Belém, Brazil
|
|-
|Loss
|align=center|6–2
|Luis Nogueira
|Submission (arm-triangle choke)
|BOTB: Para vs. Brazil
|
|align=center|2
|align=center|N/A
|Belém, Brazil
|
|-
|Win
|align=center|6–1
|Anderson dos Santos
|TKO (retirement)
|Amazon Fight 17
|
|align=center| 2
|align=center| 2:24
|Bragança, Brazil
|
|-
|Loss
|align=center|5–1
|John Lineker
|TKO (punches)
|Jungle Fight 30
|
|align=center| 3
|align=center| 0:36
|Belém, Brazil
|
|-
|Win
|align=center| 5–0
|Emerson Nascimento
|Submission (triangle choke)
|Dead Serious 18
|
|align=center|2
|align=center|N/A
|Belém, Brazil
| 
|-
|Win
|align=center|4–0
|Wilker Pereira
|Submission (armbar)
|rowspan=2|IMC: Extreme
|rowspan=2|
|align=center|1
|align=center|N/A
|rowspan=2|Belém, Brazil
|
|-
|Win
|align=center|3–0
|Milton Ivan Lima Franco
|Submission (armbar)
|align=center|1
|align=center|N/A
|
|-
|Win
|align=center|2–0
|Victor Bad Boy
|Submission (armbar)
|Super Combat 6
|
|align=center|1
|align=center|4:20
|Capanema, Brazil
|
|-
|Win
|align=center|1–0
|Biafra Reis
|Submission (rear-naked choke)
|Super Combat 5
|
|align=center|3
|align=center|3:05
|Capanema, Brazil
|

See also 

 List of male mixed martial artists

References

External links 
  
 

1989 births
Living people
Brazilian male mixed martial artists
Flyweight mixed martial artists
Mixed martial artists utilizing capoeira
Mixed martial artists utilizing wrestling
Ultimate Fighting Championship male fighters
Brazilian capoeira practitioners
Sportspeople from Pará